Circumpolar! is a novel by Richard A. Lupoff published in 1984.

Plot summary
Circumpolar! is a novel in which an alternative history is depicted with alternate geography, involving a Great Air Race with von Richthofens vs Charles Lindbergh and Howard Hughes.

Reception
Dave Langford reviewed Circumpolar! for White Dwarf #70, and stated that "It goes on a bit long and it grossly libels the Red Baron, but it's amusing."

In his Science Fact and Science Fiction: An Encyclopedia, Brian M. Stableford cited the book as one of the relatively rare examples of science fiction dealing with the Flat Earth concept.

Reviews
Review by Faren Miller (1984) in Locus, #280 May 1984
Review by Joe Sanders (1985) in Fantasy Review, July 1985
Review by L. J. Hurst (1985) in Vector 128
Review by David Pringle (1985) in Interzone, #14 Winter 1985/86
Review by Tom Easton (1986) in Analog Science Fiction/Science Fact, March 1986
Review by Don D'Ammassa (1986) in Science Fiction Chronicle, #80 May 1986

References

1984 American novels
1984 science fiction novels
American alternate history novels
American science fiction novels
Flat Earth